The Little Carpathians (also: Lesser Carpathians, ;) are a low, about 100 km long, mountain range, part of the Carpathian Mountains. The mountains are situated in Western Slovakia, covering the area from Bratislava to Nové Mesto nad Váhom, and northeastern Austria, where a very small part called Hundsheimer Berge (or Hainburger Berge) is located south of the Devín Gate. The Little Carpathians are bordered by Záhorie Lowland in the west and the Danubian Lowland in the east.

In 1976, the Little Carpathians were declared a protected area under the name Little Carpathians Protected Landscape Area, covering . The area is rich in flora and fauna diversity and contains numerous castles, most notably the Bratislava Castle, and caves. Driny is the only cave open to the public.

Description 
Geomorphologically, the Little Carpathians belong into the Alps-Himalaya System, the Carpathian Mountains sub-system, its province Western Carpathians, and its subprovince the Inner Western Carpathians.

The Little Carpathians are further divided into four parts (from south to north): Devín Carpathians, Pezinok Carpathians, Brezová Carpathians and Čachtice Carpathians.

The mountains are densely forested (90% being broad-leaved trees), and the southeastern part contains extensive vineyards (e.g. Rača, Pezinok, Modra). Several castles or castle ruins are situated in the Little Carpathians, for example Devín, Čachtice, Červený Kameň, and Smolenice castles.

Geologically, the mountain range is part of the Tatra-Fatra Belt of core mountains. There are several active faults, which have produced earthquakes. Of them the most notable is the Dobra Voda fault (1906 and 1930 produced 8.5° and 7.5° EMS-98 or equal to  =  5.7 and 5.0). This particular fault is closely monitored because of its proximity to the NPP Jaslovske Bohunice (approx. 15 km away). The Little Carpathians are seismically one of the most active regions in Slovakia and epicentres of earthquakes with approximate magnitude of 2.5 on Richter magnitude scale are located here.

There are a total of eight karst areas in the Little Carpathians: the Devín Carpathians, Borinka (Pajštún), Cajlan, Kuchyňa-orešany, Plavecký, Smolenice, Dobrovodský, and Čachtice karsts. The most important karst forms include caves Deravá, Tmavá skala, Driny, and Čachtická, and caves along the Borinský potok. Driny, a limestone cave, is the only cave open to public. Major streams include Vydrica and Suchý jarok.

Highest peaks

History 

While being a low mountain range, the Little Carpathians were always considered a mountain barrier, often attaining a height of 500 meters, as they were surrounded by various lowlands, . In the past, various types of ore were mined in the Little Carpathians used for the production of gold, silver, antimony, manganese and pyrite.

During the Second World War, the Little Carpathians were the birthplace of the partisan group Janko Kráľ. Insurgency in the mountains lasted until the occupation by the Soviet Red Army in 1945.

Tourism 
The Little Carpathians are a popular tourist destination in Western Slovakia. The mountains are used for hiking, cycling, tramping, backpacking, automobile and motorcycle tourism, skiing, cross-country skiing, and other winter sports. The mountain range contains a dense network of trails, and the recreational infrastructure is relatively well developed, especially in the south. The Little Carpathians are a popular destination for the inhabitants of Bratislava and other larger cities in the region. 

Since the Middle Ages, the area has been known for its wines and wine-making traditions. Well known centers of local wine-making include Svätý Jur, Modra and Pezinok. The main tourist centers include the Slovak capital Bratislava, Pezinská Baba (halfway between Pezinok and Pernek) and Zochova chata (near Modra).

Images

See also 

 Geomorphological division of Slovakia
 Tourism in Slovakia

References

External links 
Little Carpathians at Spectacular Slovakia
Little Carpathians Wine Route

Mountain ranges of Slovakia
Mountain ranges of Austria
Mountain ranges of the Western Carpathians